Burning Down Tomorrow is a 1990 American short documentary film. Produced and directed by Kit Thomas, the film is about the global rainforest crisis. It was nominated for an Academy Award for Best Documentary Short.

References

External links

1990 films
1990 short films
1990 documentary films
American documentary films
American independent films
1990s English-language films
1990s American films